A by-election for the United Kingdom House of Commons was held in the constituency of Arundel and Shoreham on 1 April 1971, following the death of sitting Conservative Member of Parliament (MP) Henry Kerby.

It was successfully held by the new Conservative candidate, Richard Napier Luce.

Results

Previous result

See also
Arundel and Shoreham constituency
Lists of United Kingdom by-elections
List of United Kingdom by-elections (1950-1979)

References

Arundel and Shoreham by-election
By-elections to the Parliament of the United Kingdom in West Sussex constituencies
Arundel and Shoreham by-election
20th century in Sussex
Arundel
Shoreham-by-Sea
Arundel and Shoreham by-election